Joseph Atkins (born October 6, 1965) is a Minnesota attorney and former member of the Minnesota House of Representatives. A member of the Minnesota Democratic–Farmer–Labor Party (DFL), he represented District 52B, which included portions of Dakota County in the southeastern Twin Cities metropolitan area.

Early life, education, and career
Born in South St. Paul, Atkins grew up in Inver Grove Heights, Minnesota. After graduating from Simley High School in 1984, he earned his B.A. from the University of Minnesota-Twin Cities in 1988 and his Juris Doctor magna cum laude from William Mitchell College of Law in Saint Paul in 1991. While in college and law school, he worked full-time as a law clerk and started a legal investigation business.

Atkins has been practicing law since 1991. He is a partner in the law firm of Thuet, Pugh, Rogosheske & Atkins in South St. Paul, one of Minnesota's oldest law firms. He also does significant pro bono work for those who cannot afford to hire an attorney.

Political career
In 1987, Inver Grove Heights voters elected Atkins to the School Board. At the age of 21, he was the youngest school board member in the nation. Five years later, in 1992, he was elected mayor of Inver Grove Heights, serving for 10 years to become its longest-serving mayor to that date (a record since surpassed by sitting mayor George Tourville).

Minnesota House of Representatives
Atkins was first elected to the House in 2002 and was reelected every two years until retiring in 2016.

Potential 2008 U.S. Senate run
Atkins considered entering the 2008 U.S. Senate race. He opted out, saying he preferred to remain in Minnesota.

Personal life
Atkins and his wife, Julia, have three children: John, Tom and Katie.

Honors and accolades
Atkins has garnered numerous awards for his public service, including being named one of Ten Outstanding Young Americans by the United States Jaycees in 2001.  In 2003, while in his first term in the Minnesota House, he was selected "Freshman Representative of the Year" by Politics in Minnesota magazine. Readers of local newspaper the South-West Review have also voted Atkins a "Best Local Elected Official" 10 times, more than any other official. Atkins received a rating of "10" from the Minnesota Taxpayers League in the 2011 legislative session to bring his career rating to "8".

Electoral history

References

External links

1965 births
Living people
People from South St. Paul, Minnesota
Democratic Party members of the Minnesota House of Representatives
University of Minnesota alumni
William Mitchell College of Law alumni
Minnesota lawyers
21st-century American politicians